"The Fat" is an epithet which may refer to:

 Albert II, Duke of Brunswick-Lüneburg (c. 1268–1318)
 Afonso II of Portugal (1185-1223), King of Portugal
 Charles the Fat (839-888), King of Alemannia, King of Italy, western Emperor (as Charles III), King of East Francia and King of West Francia
 Pope Clement IV (1190–1268), known as "Guy le Gros" (French for "Guy the Fat")
 Conan III, Duke of Brittany (c. 1093 to 1096–1148)
 Donough O'Brien, 2nd Earl of Thomond (died 1553)
 Floris II, Count of Holland (died 1121)
 Folke the Fat, reportedly the most powerful man in Sweden around 1100
 Frederick of Altmark ( c. 1424–1463), Margrave of the Brandenburg and Lord of the Altmark
 Henry I of Cyprus (1217–1253), King of Cyprus
 Henry I of Navarre (c. 1244–1274), King of Navarre and Count of Champagne and Brie (as Henry III)
 Henry V, Duke of Legnica (c. 1248–1296), also Duke of Jawor and Duke of Wroclaw
 Henry, Margrave of Frisia (c. 1055–1101), also Count in Rittigau and Eichsfeld
 Hugh d'Avranches, Earl of Chester (died 1101)
 Humbert II, Count of Savoy (1065–1103)
 James Mor Stewart (c. 1400-1429 or 1449), leader of two rebellions against King James I of Scotland
 John Komnenos the Fat, Byzantine noble who in 1200 attempted to usurp the imperial throne from Alexios III Angelos
 Juan Núñez I de Lara (died 1294), Lord of Lerma, Amaya, Dueñas, Palenzuela, Tordehumos, Torrelobatón and la Mota
 Leopold IV, Duke of Austria (1371–1411), Duke of Further Austria
 Louis VI of France (1081–1137), King of France
 Mieszko II the Fat (c. 1220–1246), Duke of Opole-Racibórz and Duke of Kalisz-Wieluń
 Olaf II of Norway (995–1030), King of Norway
 Peter II of Cyprus (c. 1354 or 1357−1382), King of Cyprus
 Ptolemy VIII Physcon (c. 182 BC–116 BC), Pharaoh of Egypt
 Reginald III, Duke of Guelders (1333–1371)
 Sancho I of León (died 966), King of León
 Welf II, Duke of Bavaria (1072–1120)
 William VI, Duke of Aquitaine (1004–1038)

See also
 List of people known as the Stout

Lists of people by epithet